The Very Best of Slade is a compilation album by the British rock band Slade. It was released in 2005 and reached No. 39 in the UK charts, remaining in the charts for four weeks. The album has sold 139,390 copies as of November 2015.

A DVD of the same name was also released at the same time. It features the same material that had appeared on the 1991 VHS compilation Wall of Hits. In addition, the band's 1972 Set of Six for Granada TV is included, alongside an additional number of other clips.

Track listing

Disc one

Disc two

Critical reception

Dave Thompson of AllMusic commented: "The Very Best of... Slade effectively renders every past Slade hits collection redundant, as remastered sound and a sharp eye for all the band's U.K. chart entries serve up a peerless examination of what remains one of British rock's most flawless careers. No matter that the hits went so badly off the boil around 1975-1976 - still, three-quarters of disc one is nonstop solid gold and the remainder of the set isn't far behind, as Slade's mid-'80s renaissance delivers further smashes "My Oh My" and "Run Run Away." Which would be hits enough for anybody, but the fun doesn't end there. A bonus second disc then digs into the darker recesses of the Top 75 to pull out the band's lesser successes. It's not a complete guide to Slade on 45, but it comes close enough."

Personnel
Slade
Noddy Holder – lead vocals, rhythm guitar
Dave Hill – lead guitar, backing vocals
Jim Lea – bass, piano, violin, keyboards, backing vocals
Don Powell – drums

Charts

Weekly charts

Year-end charts

References

2005 greatest hits albums
Slade compilation albums
Polydor Records compilation albums